"I Cheated Me Right Out of You" is a song written by Bobby Barker, and recorded by American country music artist Moe Bandy.  It was released in September 1979 as the first single from the album One of a Kind.  The song was Bandy's only number one country hit as a solo artist.  The single stayed at number one for a single week and spent a total of ten weeks on the country chart.

Charts

Weekly charts

Year-end charts

References
 

1979 singles
Moe Bandy songs
Song recordings produced by Ray Baker (music producer)
Columbia Records singles